The Soda Mountains are located in the eastern Mojave Desert in San Bernardino County, California, USA. The range lies to the north of Interstate 15 west of the town of Baker.

Geography
The mountains lie between the Avawatz Mountains to the north and the Bristol Mountains to the south. The Cronese Mountains are located southwest of the Soda Mountains.

Soda Mountain Solar Project 
The Soda Mountain Solar Project, a solar energy venture proposed by developers Regenerate Power of Menlo Park, California, is sited near the Joshua Tree and Death Valley national parks. The BLM also decided that Regenerate Power must secure state and county permits from the San Bernardino County Supervisors, thereby giving them the final say regarding any progression of the project. On August 23, 2016, the San Bernardino County Supervisors’ decided to deny development of the project. The board attributed its 3-2 rejection of the Environmental Impact Report to the realization that “the project would degrade pristine desert land with little benefit to area residents.” According to 5th district Supervisor Josie Gonzales, “The door could be open to another look if somehow the proponents could provide power from their plant to San Bernardino County residents at a lower price to offset the plant’s downsides.” Despite the present impediment, Reyad Fezzani, chairman and CEO of Regenerate Power, remains optimistic in plans to move forward with the project.

See also

References 

Mountain ranges of the Mojave Desert
Mountain ranges of San Bernardino County, California
Mountain ranges of Southern California